Hodd may refer to:
Andrew Hodd, an English cricketer
IL Hødd, a sports club in Norway
 Hodd, a 2009 book by Adam Thorpe
 Hodd Hill, a fort in Blackmore Vale
 Norman Hodd, an archdeacon of Blackburn

See also
 Hod (disambiguation)
 Dennis Roy Hodds